"Sangria Wine" is a song by American singers Pharrell Williams and Camila Cabello, released as a single on May 18, 2018. It was written and produced by the two performers with additional songwriting from Bia.

Background
Pharrell Williams previously co-wrote and provided background vocals for Camila Cabello's "Havana". "Sangria Wine" was originally recorded for Cabello's debut studio album Camila, but did not make the final tracklist. The song, however, is featured on her Never Be the Same Tour setlist. Williams joined Cabello on stage at the Los Angeles concert to perform the then-unreleased track. On May 16, 2018, both artists teased the release of the studio version on their social media pages, posting Polaroid photos of each other with the hashtag "#sangriawine."

Composition
"Sangria Wine" is a salsa-influenced pop song, which also comprises elements of reggae. Cabello sings in English and Spanish on the track. The pre-chorus of the song features lines in Spanish. The chorus sees Williams and Cabello's vocals coming together to sing the title phrase. Lyrically, the track sees the two performers in a "playful" back and forth, with him praising her dance moves and drawing comparisons between them and the beverage. Williams describes the titular dance move in the song's hook.

Live performances
On May 20, 2018, Williams and Cabello gave the first televised performance of the song at the 2018 Billboard Music Awards.

Credits and personnel
Credits adapted from Tidal.

Personnel

 Pharrell Williams – lead vocals, songwriting, production
 Camila Cabello – lead vocals, songwriting, production
 Bia – songwriting
 Brent Paschke – acoustic guitar, electric guitar
 Jesse McGinty – trombone
 Mike Larson – record engineering, editing
 Andrew Coleman – record engineering
 Edwin Carranza – record engineering
 Manny Marroquin – mixing engineering
 Chris Athens – mastering engineering
 Chris Galland – assistant engineering
 Todd Hurtt – assistant engineering
 Scott Desmarais – assistant engineering
 Ben Sedano – assistant engineering
 Madoka Kambe – assistant engineering
 Jacob Dennis – assistant engineering
 Masayuri Hara – assistant engineering
 Robin Florent – assistant engineering
 Thomas Cullison – assistant engineering

Charts

Certifications

Release history

References

External links

2018 singles
2018 songs
Camila Cabello songs
Pharrell Williams songs
Columbia Records singles
Song recordings produced by Pharrell Williams
Songs written by Camila Cabello
Songs written by Pharrell Williams
Macaronic songs
Songs about alcohol